Tracey D. Brown was the CEO of the American Diabetes Association until October 6, 2021, when she left to become President of Retail Products and Chief Customer Officer at Walgreen’s.  She is their first CEO to have been diagnosed with type 2 diabetes.  Before becoming CEO in 2018, she was with Sam’s Club as a Senior Vice President, CEO and managing director of RAPP Dallas and COO for the direct marketing agency Direct Impact.

Education
Brown trained as a chemical engineer and has an MBA from Columbia University.

Publications

References

Columbia Business School alumni
American women chief executives
American chief operating officers
American nonprofit chief executives
American chemical engineers
Women chemical engineers
Year of birth missing (living people)
Living people
21st-century American women